Rene Mouawad Air Base ( Maṭār ar-Raʾīs aš-Šahīd Rinih Muʿawwad), formerly and still sometimes known as Qoleiat air base  (Maṭār al-Qulayʿat), used to be a military-civil joint airport in northern Lebanon,  from the Lebanese–Syrian border.

History
In the early 1960s, the airbase was a small airport owned by an oil company, who used small IPC airplanes for transporting its engineers, staff and workers between Lebanon and the Arab countries. In 1966, the Lebanese Army took control of the airport and started expanding and developing its technological capabilities. It later became one of the most modernized air bases in the region. According to an agreement signed by the Lebanese and French republic, a number of Mirage aircraft were supplied to the air force and pilots and technicians were sent to France to continue some courses related to the specified planes. In the beginning of 1968, the military personnel finished their courses abroad and returned to Lebanon, with some pilots and technicians being transferred from Rayak Air Base to the Kleyate base. In April of the same year, two aircraft, flown by Lebanese pilots, arrived to Lebanon and other non-stop flights continued until June 1969.

Later during the Lebanese Civil War period, flights were significantly drawn down and the aircraft were kept in storage. In November 1989, the Lebanese parliament met at the airport after the Taif Agreement and elected René Moawad president. Having been assassinated in Beirut seventeen days later, the airport was later renamed in his honor, by a decree from the Lebanese parliament, and thus the airbase was established and became under the control of the Lebanese Air Force (in regards to the equipment and facilities) and under the jurisdiction of the North regional command (in regards to defense and order).

Middle East Airlines formerly ran flights between this air base and Beirut to serve Tripoli and the surrounding area.

On July 13, 2006, the Israeli Air Force bombed the airbase during the 2006 Israel Lebanon conflict. The airport has since been repaired and in service, mainly by the Lebanese Air Force, although domestic flights may be flown in the near future connecting Beirut and Tripoli. To date, however, there has been no discussion on the matter.

Future development
In 2010, Lebanon's director-general of the Lebanese Civil Aviation Authority, Dr Hamdi Chaouk announced that an international airport would be built at Kleyate with construction due to start in 2011. The Rene Mouawad Air Base airport will primarily be used for cargo and low-cost carriers and will make it possible to travel to the North of the country without travelling by road from Beirut.

In January 2012, the Lebanese cabinet announced plans to restore the airport so that it will be used for cargo and low-cost airlines. Lebanese authorities who have visited the airport announced that the airport will encompass a  Duty-Free area and that there is major consideration about connecting the airport to Tripoli and major cities using a modern railway. To date, however, nothing has come of these plans, and restoration of the airport has not yet begun.

See also

Rayak Air Base
Lebanese Air Force
Beirut Rafic Hariri International Airport

References

Airports in Lebanon
Lebanese Air Force bases
Airports with year of establishment missing